The 1872 West Virginia gubernatorial election took place on October 8, 1872, to elect the governor of West Virginia.

Incumbent John Jeremiah Jacob was denied renomination by the Democratic Party, which was controlled by Camden. Jacob ran on the ad hoc "People's Independent" ticket with Republican support. He was re-elected by 2400 votes for a four-year term. Camden's men controlled the legislature, and passed "ripper" laws that stripped Jacob of his appointment powers.

West Virginia began electing its governor to a 4-year term, starting this election. Previously the governor was elected to a 2-year term.

Results

References

1872
gubernatorial
West Virginia
October 1872 events